Kalesar (also known as Kelāsar and Kolā Sar) is a village in Vilkij-e Shomali Rural District, in the Central District of Namin County, Ardabil Province, Iran. At the 2006 census, its population was 1,176, in 280 families.

References 

Towns and villages in Namin County